Peter Lucas (8 June 1933 – 19 July 2001) was a New Zealand rower.

He competed for New Zealand in the 1956 Summer Olympics at Melbourne. He was in the coxed four which came fourth in the semifinal and did not qualify.

Lucas died in 2001 and was buried at Waitara Cemetery.

References 

 Black Gold by Ron Palenski (2008, 2004 New Zealanders Sports Hall of Fame, Dunedin) p. 60

External links 
 
 

1933 births
2001 deaths
New Zealand male rowers
Rowers at the 1956 Summer Olympics
Olympic rowers of New Zealand
Burials at Waitara Cemetery